Hyllisia tonkinea is a species of beetle in the family Cerambycidae. It was described by Fairmaire in 1888.

References

tonkinea
Beetles described in 1888